The Charles Gunn House (also known as the Bellenger Home) is a historic residence in Gadsden, Alabama.  The house was built in 1886 by Edward Tracy Hollingsworth, a local merchant and banker.  Charles Logan Gunn, a dentist, purchased the house in 1901.  His daughter, Carolyn Gunn Bellenger inherited the house, and willed it to the city upon her death in 1990.  The city restored the house and now rents it for meetings and events.

The highly decorated Victorian house has a mansard roof with projecting gable atop a bay window on the north and east sides.  The façade also features a wraparound porch with latticework balustrade.  The house was listed on the Alabama Register of Landmarks and Heritage in 1984 and the National Register of Historic Places in 1993.

References

National Register of Historic Places in Etowah County, Alabama
Houses on the National Register of Historic Places in Alabama
Victorian architecture in Alabama
Houses completed in 1886
Houses in Etowah County, Alabama
1886 establishments in Alabama
Buildings and structures in Gadsden, Alabama